Jorge Torruellas (born 3 February 1952) is a Puerto Rican alpine skier. He competed in the men's slalom at the 1988 Winter Olympics. He also competed in the men's moguls in the 1992 Winter Olympics.

References

1952 births
Living people
Puerto Rican male alpine skiers
Puerto Rican male freestyle skiers
Olympic alpine skiers of Puerto Rico
Olympic freestyle skiers of Puerto Rico
Alpine skiers at the 1988 Winter Olympics
Freestyle skiers at the 1992 Winter Olympics
Place of birth missing (living people)